Craig Robert Stadler (born June 2, 1953) is an American professional golfer who has won numerous tournaments at both the PGA Tour and Champions Tour level, including one major championship, the 1982 Masters Tournament.

Early life
Stadler was born in San Diego His father started him in golf at age four, and he displayed a talent for golf early in life. Stadler attended La Jolla High School He won the 1973 U.S. Amateur, while attending the University of Southern California, where he was a teammate of future PGA Tour winners Mark Pfeil and Scott Simpson. Stadler was an All-American all four years – first-team his sophomore and junior years; second-team his freshman and senior years. Stadler finished college in 1975 and turned professional in 1976.

Professional career
Stadler won his first two PGA Tour events in 1980, at the Bob Hope Desert Classic and the Greater Greensboro Open. His career year was 1982 when he won four PGA Tour events including the Masters Tournament after a playoff with Dan Pohl and the World Series of Golf at the end of the year. Stadler won the money list for the only time. His next win was at the 1984 Byron Nelson Classic. 

Despite playing relatively well, Stadler did not win a PGA Tour event for over 7 years (May 1984 – November 1991) during the heart of his career. During this period he recorded six runner-up performances and dozens of top-10s on the PGA Tour. He had more success at winning international tournaments. He won the 1985 Swiss Open on the European Tour and the 1987 Dunlop Phoenix Tournament on the Japan Golf Tour. He had great success at the Scandinavian Enterprise Open too, an official event on the European Tour, finishing runner-up at the 1983 and 1986 events until finally winning in 1990. His winless streak in America was broken at the final event of the 1991 season, defeating Russ Cochran in a playoff at the Tour Championship.

Stadler won the B.C. Open in 2003, becoming the first player over age 50 to win a PGA Tour event in 28 years and the first player ever to win on the PGA Tour after he had won on the Champions Tour. He won 13 PGA Tour events in all, and played on the 1983 and 1985 Ryder Cup teams.

In 1994 he was the featured coach for the Sega Saturn video game Pebble Beach Golf Links. In 1996 he appeared as himself in the film Tin Cup.

Stadler began playing on the Champions Tour upon becoming eligible in June 2003. His greatest successes came during his first two years of eligibility; he was the leading money winner in his first full year on that tour in 2004. Stadler underwent total left-hip-replacement surgery in Los Angeles on September 15, 2010, which limits his playing time.

Very popular with the galleries, Stadler is affectionately called "The Walrus" for his portly build and ample mustache. He currently lives in Denver, Colorado. His son Kevin is also a PGA Tour champion. Stadler and his son Kevin are the only father and son who have both won on both the PGA Tour and the European Tour.

Stadler's brother Gary Stadler is a Billboard-charting recording artist.

Stadler announced that the 2014 Masters Tournament, his 38th and in which he played with Kevin, was his last.

Amateur wins
1973 U.S. Amateur
1975 Southwestern Amateur

Professional wins (30)

PGA Tour wins (13)

PGA Tour playoff record (3–3)

European Tour wins (3)

European Tour playoff record (1–1)

Japan Golf Tour wins (1)

South American Tour wins (1)
1992 Argentine Open

Other wins (4)

Other playoff record (1–1)

Champions Tour wins (9)

Champions Tour playoff record (1–2)

Major championships

Wins (1)

1Defeated Pohl with par on first extra hole.

Results timeline

CUT = missed the halfway cut (3rd round cut in 1975 and 1985 Open Championships)
WD = withdrew
"T" indicates a tie for a place.

Summary

Most consecutive cuts made – 11 (1990 PGA – 1993 U.S. Open)
Longest streak of top-10s – 2 (twice)

Results in The Players Championship

CUT = missed the halfway cut
"T" indicates a tie for a place

Results in World Golf Championships

1Cancelled due to 9/11

QF, R16, R32, R64 = Round in which player lost in match play
NT = No tournament

Senior major championships

Wins (2)

U.S. national team appearances
Amateur
Walker Cup: 1975 (winners)

Professional
Ryder Cup: 1983 (winners), 1985
UBS Cup: 2003 (tie), 2004 (winners)
Wendy's 3-Tour Challenge (representing Champions Tour): 2003, 2004, 2005 (winners), 2006

See also
Spring 1976 PGA Tour Qualifying School graduates
List of golfers with most PGA Tour wins

References

External links

American male golfers
USC Trojans men's golfers
PGA Tour golfers
PGA Tour Champions golfers
Ryder Cup competitors for the United States
Winners of men's major golf championships
Winners of senior major golf championships
Golfers from San Diego
Golfers from Denver
1953 births
Living people